Margaret Visser (born May 11, 1940) is a Canadian writer and broadcaster who lives in Toronto, Paris, and South West France. Her subject matter is the history, anthropology, and mythology of everyday life.

Biography
Born in South Africa, she attended school in Zambia, Zimbabwe, France (the Sorbonne) and the University of Toronto where she earned a PhD in Classics.

Visser taught Greek and Latin at York University in North York, Toronto for 18 years. For several years Visser regularly appeared on the Canadian Broadcasting Corporation's popular radio program Morningside in conversations with Peter Gzowski. Her writing has won many awards, including the Glenfiddich Award for Food Book of the Year in Britain in 1989, the International Association of Culinary Professionals' Literary Food Writing Award, and the Jane Grigson Award. Visser delivered the 2002 CBC Massey Lectures. Her topic was "Beyond Fate."

Visser is married to Colin Visser, professor emeritus of the English Department of the University of Toronto.

In 2017, Visser's 1992 book, The Rituals of Dinner was re-issued, on her birthday, and The Guardians review of it noted her wry humour.  The review noted "Twenty-five years after its first publication, Visser’s book remains a delightful guide to how we eat, and why it matters."

In 2018, the Washington Post cited Visser, on the etiquette of cannibalism, from her 1992 book on dining manners, Much depends on dinner, when reporting on the bizarre case of a California high school girl who claimed she served her classmates cookies that contained her grandfather's ashes.

In September, 2019, Visser was one of the experts interviewed for a documentary on what recent archeological discoveries say about Mayan dining habits.

Publications
 ,

References

External links
Official website

1940 births
Living people
Afrikaner people
South African people of Dutch descent
University of Paris alumni
University of Toronto alumni
Canadian radio personalities
South African expatriates in Canada
20th-century Canadian women writers
20th-century Canadian non-fiction writers
21st-century Canadian women writers
21st-century Canadian non-fiction writers
Canadian women non-fiction writers